IBM code page 899 (CCSID 899) is a computing code page used under DOS to type mathematical symbols. It is also used by some printers. It contains the same characters as code page 259, but in a different arrangement.

Codepage layout

Characters are shown with their equivalent Unicode codes.

Code page 1092
Code page 1092 (CCSID 1092) is very similar to code page 899. The only difference is that code 0xC8 is mapped to  U+2500  instead of  U+2015 .

References

DOS code pages